Physisporinus yunnanensis is a species of fungi belonging to the basidiomycetes, in the family Meripilaceae. It was described in early 2023 by Jia Cai. The species was found in Yunnan, China. It is a white rot fungus which forms bone-hard fruiting bodies which bear the basidia.

References 

Meripilaceae
Polyporales genera
Taxa described in 2023